Ryan Bowser is an American record producer from St. Louis, Missouri, United States. He has worked for many artists during his career, mainly R&B and soul music.

Information
Bowser began producing and working with local artists including Nelly, City Spud, and the St. Lunatics in the late 1990s. His vocals can still be heard singing background on their Free City album Groovin' Tonight, featuring Brian McKnight. Bowser joined forces with longtime friend Antoine "Bam" Macon to form the production duo The Nimrods in early 2000. Bowser's first noted major placement was Arista Recording artist, Toya Rodriguez, professionally known as Toya in 2001. He produced over 50 percent of the album including her most popular hit "I DO!" The single and debut album Toya, sold approximately 400,000 copies. In 2001, Bowser's remake of Patti LaBelle's "Love Need and Want You" featured as "Dilemma" on Nelly's album, Nellyville. The single landed at #1 on the Billboard Hot R&B/Hip Hop Singles & Tracks, Hot Rap Tracks and on the Hot 100 as the first rap song to hold the #1 spot for 12 consecutive weeks earning a Grammy for Best R&B and Rap Collaboration. "Dilemma" now sits at #64 on Billboard's Greatest Songs Of All Time and is the most successful song of Nelly's career, giving him his first number-one single in many countries, such as Australia, Belgium, Germany, Ireland, The Netherlands, Switzerland, United Kingdom and the United States. "Dilemma" was nominated twice for Best Music Video at the 2003 Soul Train Awards and MTV Music Video Awards.

His success led him to producing for major artist and in 2005 he split from the Nimrods and he began branding himself as the producer named, Ghost Music. Bowser earned the attention and support of several label executives and Ghost has been signed to EMI Music Publishing by John "Big Jon" Platt. In 2014, Bowser closed the year out producing two big singles for Sony UK pop group Moorhouse, as well as new rap artist Eric Martinez hit single "Seasons" featured on his recent project Inspired By 92. Bowser went on to open 2015 producing a hit single for Columbia Records female rap artist Dej Loaf titled "Me U & Hennessy" featuring Lil Wayne along with her producer DDS.

Discography
Toya 2001
"Dilemma" 2002
Nellyville 2002
Simply Deep 2002
After the Storm 2003
"Me U & Hennessy" 2014

References

External links
Full Production List
Yahoo Filmography

Record producers from Missouri
Living people
Year of birth missing (living people)